Ipo Dam is a concrete water reservoir gravity dam found in the Philippines. The dam is located about 7.5 kilometres downstream of the Angat Dam within the Angat Watershed Forest Reserve in Norzagaray, Bulacan province. It was a part of the Angat-Ipo-La Mesa water system. Its normal level is 101 m.

The Ipo Dam is a gravity concrete dam located about 7.5 kilometres downstream of the Angat Dam near its confluence with the Ipo River in Bulacan. It was completed in January 1984 with a maximum storage capacity of 7.5 million cubic metres, an increase of about 2,500 million litres per day (MLD) from the old Ipo Dam, which was completed in December 1938, used to be located 200 metres upstream of the new dam.

The spill level of the dam is at an elevation of 101 metres and it has seven radial floodgates. The watershed topography is characterised by mountainous terrain similar to the Angat Reservoir Watershed with moderate forest cover. The watershed has an area of about 70 square kilometers and receives an average annual rainfall of 3,500 millimeters. Tributaries to the Angat River at this section include the Ipo, Sapa Pako and Sapa Anginon Rivers. These tributaries drain into the Angat River from the eastern section of the watershed.

Water from the dam is diverted to the Novaliches Portal and the La Mesa Dam through three intake structures going down to three connecting tunnels into five connecting aqueducts.

Battle of Ipo Dam
On 19 May 1945, during WWII, the dam was captured in the Battle of Ipo Dam. The Yay Regiment of the Marking Guerrillas, under the command of Col. Marcos V. Agustin, and the 43rd Division, supported by the Fifth Air Force, captured the water source intact from the Japanese defenders.

References

 Ipo Dam tree planting

Dams completed in 1984
Sierra Madre (Philippines)
Buildings and structures in Bulacan